Zahid Mammadov (born 16 September 1981) is a retired taekwondo athlete for the Azerbaijan. Notably, he won a Bronze medal at the 2003 World Championships and a Silver medal at the 2006 European Championships.

References

1981 births
Living people
Azerbaijani male taekwondo practitioners
European Taekwondo Championships medalists
World Taekwondo Championships medalists
20th-century Azerbaijani people
21st-century Azerbaijani people